U Can Never B2 Straight is a 2002 album by Boy George. The album includes acoustic songs from George's London play Taboo, new and previously unreleased songs, as well as selected songs taken from his albums Cheapness and Beauty and The Martyr Mantras, the latter from when George was part of the band Jesus Loves You.

Album overview
The album includes 16 songs (8 previously unreleased), each dedicated to someone in particular or in general. Three songs are dedicated to George's ex-boyfriend Michael Dunne ("If I Could Fly", "Losing Control" and "The Deal"), whereas "Unfinished Business" is for Kirk Brandon (who took George to court for this song, but lost).

The hidden track "Out of Fashion" was taken out as a single in remixed form as a collaboration with dance duo Hi-Gate; a version of the song is also featured on the Taboo musical soundtrack. Another track which was released as video-only was the opener "Ich Bin Kunst", a song dealing with the late performance artist Leigh Bowery, a great friend of George's, whose character he took on in his musical. (George would re-record the song again as Bowery in a more campy and rock-style arrangement for the 2004 Broadway cast recording of the musical.)

U Can Never B2 Straight includes all the acoustic ballads originally on George's 1995 album Cheapness and Beauty, including the single "Il Adore", as well as "Same Thing in Reverse" (a different version from the dance remix which reached No. 1 on the US Billboard Dance Chart). "Same Thing in Reverse" is dedicated in the booklet credits to 'Eminem and all scared, pretty homosexuals'... The song "Julian", a new song, is also featured on the EP Straight, a CD which was included with George's 2005 autobiography of the same name.

The album also contains the following three tracks: "She Was Never He", taken from the 1999 fan-requested compilation The Unrecoupable One Man Bandit; "Fat Cat", originally on Culture Club's 1999 reunion album Don't Mind If I Do, and the popular Krishna-inspired "Bow Down Mister", which gave George one of his last UK chart successes after splitting from Culture Club.

Reviews

AllMusic gave the album 4.5 stars out of 5. It also got four stars from Q magazine.

Track listing
"Ich Bin Kunst" (2002) (song from the musical Taboo) – 2:38 (Boy George, Kevan Frost)
"St. Christopher" (2002) (new song) – 3:46 (Boy George, Kevan Frost)
"She Was Never He" (1996) (unreleased mixed version) – 3:33 (Boy George, John Themis)
"Cheapness & Beauty" (1995) (acoustic version taken from the "Il Adore" single) – 3:47 (Boy George, John Themis)
"Fat Cat" (1999) (acoustic version) – 3:24 (Boy George, Emily Themis)
"If I Could Fly" (1995) (taken from Cheapness and Beauty) – 4:08 (Boy George, John Themis)
"Unfinished Business" (1995) (taken from Cheapness and Beauty) – 3:36 (Boy George, John Themis)
"Julian" (2002) (new song) – 3:39 (Boy George, Kevan Frost)
"Wrong" (2002) (new song originally in Taboo) – 4:07 (Boy George, Kevan Frost)
"Letter to a School Friend" (1996) (unreleased) – 3:49 (Boy George, John Themis)
"The Deal" (2002) (old live favourite performed circa 1991–93) – 4:41 (Boy George, John Themis)
"Losing Control" (1992–2002) (unreleased version adapted from a 1992 Jesus Loves You country demo) – 3:15 (Boy George, John Themis)
"Same Thing in Reverse" (1995) (from Cheapness and Beauty) – 3:35 (Boy George, John Themis)
"Il Adore" (1995) (from Cheapness and Beauty) – 6:14 (Boy George, John Themis)
"Bow Down Mister" (1991) (from Jesus Loves You's The Martyr Mantras) (Boy George) - 6:30
"Out of Fashion" (2002) (acoustic version of a song from Taboo) – hidden bonus track - 6:30 (begins after 28 seconds of silence, following "Bow Down Mister") Boy George, Paul Masterson, Judge Jules

Personnel

Ich Bin Kunst
dedicated to Leigh Bowery, Nicola and Christine Bateman
Boy George: co-production
Kevan Frost: keyboards, drum programming & brass arrangements; mix at Frosty Bros. Studio (Kev's flat); co-production
Ben Castle: saxophone & brass arrangements
Raul D'Olivera: trumpet
Mike Innes: trombone

St. Christopher
dedicated to Chris Manning
Boy George: co-production
Kevan Frost: backing vocals, acoustic guitar & brass arrangements; mix at Frosty Bros. Studio (Kev's flat); co-production
Ben Castle: saxophone & brass arrangements
Raul D'Olivera: trumpet
Mike Innes: trombone
Sharleen Hector: backing vocals

She Was Never He
dedicated to Natasha and Jody 
Boy George: co-production
John Themis: guitars, backing vocals, co-production; mix at Mayfair Studios
Kevan Frost: backing vocals
Alan Branch: engineer

Cheapness & Beauty
dedicated to all tattooed car thieves – dedicated to Jon Moss
Jessica Corcoran: production
John Themis: guitars, backing vocals, strip & remix
Zee Asha: backing vocals
Alan Branch: engineer

Fat Cat
dedicated to all sexually confused straight boys?
John Themis: guitars, production; mix at home
Emily Themis, Katherine Themis: backing vocals

If I Could Fly
dedicated to Michael Dunne
Jessica Corcoran: production
John Themis: guitars & string arrangements; mix at Abbey Road Studios
Nick Ingman: string arrangements
London Chamber Orchestra: strings

Unfinished Business
dedicated to Kirk Brandon
Jessica Corcoran: production & mix
John Themis: guitars, string arrangements & mix

Julian
dedicated to Julian
Boy George: co-production
Kevan Frost: acoustic guitar, backing vocals and co-production; mix at Frosty Bros. Studio (Kev's flat)

Wrong
dedicated to Luke and all dreamers
Boy George: co-production
Kevan Frost: acoustic guitar, bass guitar, backing vocals and co-production; mix at Frosty Bros. Studio (Kev's flat)
Pete Adams: piano & Hammond
Liz Chi: Chinese violin "edu" solo
Joel Pott, Sharleen Hector, John Gibbons: backing vocals

Letter To A School Friend
dedicated to Miss Carter and Michael Crome
John Themis: guitars, production; mix at Mayfair Studios
Zee Asha, Linda Duggan, Mary Pearse: backing vocals
Richie Stevens: drums  
Winston Blisset: bass
Peter Adams: keyboards
Alan Branch: engineer

The Deal
dedicated to Michael Dunne
Boy George: co-production
Kevan Frost: acoustic guitar, keyboards, backing vocals and co-production; mix at Frosty Bros. Studio (Kev's flat)
Liz Chi: violins & violin solo
Sarah Chi: violins
Sharleen Hector, John Gibbons: backing vocals

Losing Control
dedicated to Michael Dunne
John Themis: guitars, keyboards, bass, backing vocals, production & mix
Sugar Hajishakalli: bouzouki
Andy Kyriacou: drums
Jimmy "Mixologist" Sarikas: engineer

Same Thing In Reverse
dedicated to Eminem and all scared, pretty homosexuals
John Themis: guitars, backing vocals
Zee Asha: backing vocals
Jessica Corcoran: production & mix

Il Adore
dedicated to Stevie Hughes and all the lost boys
Jessica Corcoran: production
John Themis: guitars, string arrangements; mix at Abbey Road Studios
Nick Ingram: string arrangements
London Chamber Orchestra: strings
Christopher Warren Green: violin solo

Bow Down Mister
dedicated to Lord Krishna and John Richardson & family
Bruce Forest: production
Soho Krishna Temple, London Gospel Choir & Basil: special thanks

References

2002 albums
Boy George albums
Virgin Records albums